The Flat River is a river in the U.S. state of Rhode Island. There are no dams along the river's length.

Course
The river is formed in Coventry by the confluence of Sawmill and Pine Swamp brooks. The river flows east to converge with the Big River to form the South Branch Pawtuxet River in the area now flooded by the Flat River Reservoir.

Crossings
Below is a list of all crossings over the Flat River. The list starts at the headwaters and goes downstream.
Coventry
Maple Valley Road
Franklin Road
Hammet Road
Maple Valley Road
Flat River Road (RI 117)

Tributaries
Above Flat River Reservoir, the tributaries of the Flat River include: Turkey Meadow Brook, Negro Sawmill Brook, Pine Swamp Brook, Whaley Brook, and McCuster Brook, as well as various other unnamed streams.

See also
List of rivers in Rhode Island
Flat River (Washington County)

References

Maps from the United States Geological Survey

Rivers of Kent County, Rhode Island
Rivers of Rhode Island
Tributaries of Providence River